The Vinaya Piṭaka (English: Basket of Discipline) is the first of the three divisions of the Tripiṭaka, the definitive canonical collection of scripture of Theravada Buddhism. The other two parts of the Tripiṭaka are the Sutta Piṭaka and the Abhidhamma Piṭaka. Its primary subject matter is the monastic rules of conduct for monks and nuns of the Sangha.

Origins
According to tradition, the Tripiṭaka was compiled at the First Council shortly after the Buddha's death. The Vinaya Piṭaka is said to have been recited by Upāli, with little later addition. Most of the different versions are fairly similar, most scholars consider most of the Vinaya to be fairly early, that is, dating from before the separation of schools.

Contents
The Pāli Vinaya consists of:
 Suttavibhaṅga: Pāṭimokkha and commentary
 Mahāvibhaṅga: rules for monks
 Bhikkhunīvibhaṅga: rules for nuns
 Khandhaka: 22 chapters on various topics
 Parivāra: analyses of rules from various points of view

The Pali version of the Patimokkha contains 227 rules for bhikkhus and 311 rules for bhikkhunis. The Vibhaṅga sections consist of commentary on these rules, giving detailed explanations of them along with the origin stories for each rule. The Khandhaka section gives numerous supplementary rules grouped by subject that also consist of origin stories.

Place in the tradition 
According to the sutras, in the first years of the Buddha's teaching the sangha lived together in harmony with no vinaya, as there was no need, because all of the Buddha's early disciples were highly realized if not fully enlightened. As the sangha expanded, situations arose which the Buddha and the lay community felt were inappropriate for mendicants.

The first rule to be established was the prohibition against sexual intercourse. The origin story tells of an earnest monk whose family was distraught that there was no male heir and so persuaded the monk to impregnate his former wife. All three—the monk, his wife and son, the latter of whom later ordained—eventually became fully enlightened arhats.

The Buddha called his teaching the "Dhamma-Vinaya", emphasizing both the philosophical teachings of Buddhism as well as the training in virtue that embodies that philosophy. Shortly before his passing, the Buddha clarified to his disciples through Ānanda:

See also
 Abhidhamma Pitaka
 Access to Insight
 Buddhist Publication Society
 Dhamma Society Fund
 List of suttas
 Pāli Canon
 Pali Text Society
 Pariyatti (bookstore)
 Sutta Piṭaka
 Vinaya
 Upāli

References

Sources

Literature
 Davids, T. W. Rhys, Oldenberg, Hermann (joint tr): Vinaya texts, Oxford, The Clarendon press 1881. Vol.1 Vol.2 Vol.3 Internet Archive

External links
 Pali Canon online: Vinaya Pitaka in English
 Translation by T. W. Rhys Davids and Hermann Oldenberg
 Access to Insight translation
 Translation by Isaline Blew Horner

 
Theravada Buddhist texts